Dagalaifus or Dagalaiphus may refer to:

 Dagalaifus (magister equitum), Roman army officer, consul in 366
 Dagalaifus (consul 461), Roman politician, consul 461
 Areobindus Dagalaifus Areobindus, son of the latter, consul 506